Mesoleius is a genus of ichneumon wasps in the family Ichneumonidae. There are at least 160 described species in Mesoleius.

See also
 List of Mesoleius species

References

Further reading

External links

 

Ctenopelmatinae